Tianya is a county-level district under the jurisdiction of the city of Sanya, Hainan. The district was established on 12 February 2014.

Former administrative subdivisions
Tianya has jurisdiction over the former towns and subdistricts of:

References

Sanya
County-level divisions of Hainan